Anaheim is a city in northern Orange County, California, part of the Los Angeles metropolitan area. As of the 2020 United States Census, the city had a population of 346,824, making it the most populous city in Orange County, the 10th-most populous city in California, and the 55th-most populous city in the United States. Anaheim is the second-largest city in Orange County in terms of land area, and is known for being the home of the Disneyland Resort, the Anaheim Convention Center, and two major sports teams: the Los Angeles Angels baseball team and the Anaheim Ducks ice hockey club.

Anaheim was founded by fifty German families in 1857 and incorporated as the second city in Los Angeles County on March 18, 1876; Orange County was split off from Los Angeles County in 1889. Anaheim remained largely an agricultural community until Disneyland opened on July 17, 1955. This led to the construction of several hotels and motels around the area, and residential districts in Anaheim soon followed. The city also developed into an industrial center, producing electronics, aircraft parts and canned fruit. Anaheim is a charter city.

Anaheim's city limits extend almost the full width of Orange County, from Cypress in the west, twenty miles east to the Riverside County line, encompassing a diverse range of neighborhoods. In the west, mid-20th-century tract houses predominate. Downtown Anaheim has three mixed-use historic districts, the largest of which is the Anaheim Colony. South of downtown, a center of commercial activity of regional importance begins, the Anaheim–Santa Ana edge city, which stretches east and south into the cities of Orange, Santa Ana and Garden Grove. This edge city includes the Disneyland Resort, with two theme parks, multiple hotels, and its retail district; Disney is part of the larger Anaheim Resort district with numerous other hotels and retail complexes. The Platinum Triangle, a neo-urban redevelopment district surrounding Angel Stadium, which is planned to be populated with mixed-use streets and high-rises. Further east, Anaheim Canyon is an industrial district north of the Riverside Freeway and east of the Orange Freeway. The city's eastern third consists of Anaheim Hills, a community built to a master plan, and open land east of the Route 241 tollway.

Toponymy
Anaheim's name is a blend of Ana, after the nearby Santa Ana River, and German -heim meaning "home", which is also a common Germanic place name compound (compare Trondheim in Norway and many place names in Germany).

History

Tongva era
Tongva people are indigenous to Anaheim's region of Southern California. Evidence suggests their presence since 3500 BCE. The Tongva village at Anaheim was called Hutuukuga. The village has been noted as one of the largest Tongva villages throughout Tovaangar. Native plants like oak trees and sage bushes were an important food source, as well as rabbit and mule deer for meat. The village had deep trade connections with coastal villages and those further inland.

Spanish and Mexican era

The area that makes up modern-day Anaheim, along with Placentia and Fullerton, were part of the Rancho San Juan Cajón de Santa Ana, a Mexican-era rancho grant, given to Juan Pacífico Ontiveros in 1837 by Juan Bautista Alvarado, then Governor of Alta California. Following the American Conquest of California, the rancho was patented to Ontiveros by Public Land Commission. In 1857, Ontiveros sold 1,160 acres (out of his more than 35,000 acre estate) to 50 German-American families for the founding of Anaheim.

Founding
The city of Anaheim was founded in 1857 by 50 German-Americans who were residents of San Francisco and whose families had originated in Rothenburg ob der Tauber, Franconia in Bavaria. After traveling through the state looking for a suitable area to grow grapes, the group decided to purchase a  parcel from Juan Pacífico Ontiveros' large Rancho San Juan Cajón de Santa Ana in present-day Orange County for $2 per acre.

For $750 a share, the group formed the Anaheim Vineyard Company headed by George Hansen. Their new community was named Annaheim, meaning "home by the Santa Ana River" in German. The name later was altered to Anaheim. To the Spanish-speaking neighbors, the settlement was known as Campo Alemán.

Although grape and wine-making was their primary objective, the majority of the 50 settlers were mechanics, carpenters and craftsmen with no experience in wine-making. The community set aside  for a town center and a school was the first building erected there. The first home was built in 1857, the Anaheim Gazette newspaper was established in 1870 and a hotel in 1871. The census of 1870 reported a population of 565 for the Anaheim district. For 25 years, the area was the largest wine producer in California. However, in 1884, a disease infected the grape vines and by the following year the entire industry was destroyed. Other crops – walnuts, lemons and oranges – soon filled the void. Fruits and vegetables had become viable cash crops when the Los Angeles – Orange County region was connected to the continental railroad network in 1887.

Helena Modjeska
Polish actress Helena Modjeska settled in Anaheim with her husband and various friends, among them Henryk Sienkiewicz, Julian Sypniewski and Łucjan Paprocki. While living in Anaheim, Helena Modjeska became good friends with Clementine Langenberger, the second wife of August Langenberger. Helena Street and Clementine Street are named after these two ladies, and the streets are located adjacent to each other as a symbol of the strong friendship which Helena Modjeska and Clementine Lagenberger shared. Modjeska Park in West Anaheim, is also named after Helena Modjeska.

Early 20th century

During the first half of the 20th century, Anaheim was a massive rural community dominated by orange groves and the landowners who farmed them. One of the landowners was Bennett Payne Baxter, who owned much land in northeast Anaheim that today is the location of Angel Stadium. He came up with many new ideas for irrigating orange groves and shared his ideas with other landowners. He was not only successful, he helped other landowners and businesspeople succeed as well. Ben Baxter and other landowners helped to make Anaheim a thriving rural community before the opening of Disneyland transformed the city. A street along Edison Park is named Baxter Street. Also during this time, Rudolph Boysen served as Anaheim's first Park Superintendent from 1921 to 1950. Boysen created a hybrid berry which Walter Knott later named the boysenberry, after Rudy Boysen. Boysen Park in East Anaheim was also named after him.

In 1924, Ku Klux Klan members were elected to the Anaheim City Council on a platform of political reform. Up until that point, the city had been controlled by a long-standing business and civic elite that was mostly German American. Given their tradition of moderate social drinking, the German Americans did not strongly support prohibition laws of the day. The mayor himself was a former saloon keeper. Led by the minister of the First Christian Church, the Klan represented a rising group of politically oriented non-ethnic Germans who denounced the elite as corrupt, undemocratic, and self-serving. The Klansmen aimed to create what they saw as a model, orderly community, one in which prohibition against alcohol would be strictly enforced. At the time, the KKK had about 1200 members in Orange County. The economic and occupational profile of the pro and anti-Klan groups shows the two were similar and about equally prosperous. Klan members were Protestants, as were the majority of their opponents; however, the opposition to the Klan also included many Catholic Germans. Individuals who joined the Klan had earlier demonstrated a much higher rate of voting and civic activism than did their opponents, and many of the individuals in Orange County who joined the Klan did so out of a sense of civic activism. Upon easily winning the local Anaheim election in April 1924, the Klan representatives promptly fired city employees who were known to be Catholic and replaced them with Klan appointees. The new city council tried to enforce prohibition. After its victory, the Klan chapter held large rallies and initiation ceremonies over the summer.

The opposition to the KKK's hold on Anaheim politics organized, bribed a Klansman for their secret membership list, and exposed the Klansmen running in the state primaries, defeating most of the candidates. Klan opponents in 1925 took back local government, and succeeded in a special election in recalling the Klansmen who had been elected in April 1924. The Klan in Anaheim quickly collapsed; its newspaper closed after losing a libel suit, and the minister who led the local Klavern moved to Kansas.

Mid to late 20th century: Disneyland and the Anaheim Resort

Construction of the Disneyland theme park began on July 16, 1954, and it opened to the public on July 17, 1955. It has become one of the world's most visited tourist attractions, with over 650 million visitors since its opening. The location was formerly  of orange and walnut trees. The opening of Disneyland created a tourism boom in the Anaheim area. Walt Disney had originally intended to purchase additional land to build accommodations for Disneyland visitors; however, the park's construction drained his financial resources and he was unable to acquire more land. Entrepreneurs eager to capitalize on Disney's success moved in and built hotels, restaurants, and shops around Disneyland and eventually boxed in the Disney property, and turned the area surrounding Disneyland into the boulevards of colorful neon signs that Walt Disney had tried to avoid. The city of Anaheim, eager for tax revenue these hotels would generate, did little to obstruct their construction.

By the mid-1960s, the city's explosive growth would attract a Major League Baseball team, with the California Angels relocating from Los Angeles to Anaheim in 1966, where they have remained since. In 1980, the National Football League's Los Angeles Rams relocated from the Los Angeles Memorial Coliseum to the Angels' home field, Anaheim Stadium, playing there until their relocation to St. Louis in 1995. In 1993, Anaheim gained its own National Hockey League team when The Walt Disney Company founded the Mighty Ducks of Anaheim.

In the 1990s, while Disneyland was undergoing a significant expansion project surrounding the construction of Disney California Adventure Park, the city of Anaheim rebranded the surrounding area as the Anaheim Resort. The Anaheim Resort district is roughly bounded by the Santa Ana River to the east, Ball Road to the north, Walnut Street to the west, and the Garden Grove city limits to the south at Chapman Avenue, and Orangewood Avenue to the southwest. Attractions within the Resort District include the Disneyland Resort, the Anaheim Convention Center, the Honda Center, Anaheim/Orange County Walk of Stars, and Angel Stadium of Anaheim.

Part of the project included removing the colorful neon signs and replacing them with shorter, more modest signs, as well as widening the arterial streets in the area into tree-lined boulevards.

21st century

In 2001, Disney's California Adventure (renamed Disney California Adventure Park in 2010), the most expansive project in Disneyland's history, opened to the public. In 2007, Anaheim celebrated its sesquicentennial.

In July 2012, political protests by Hispanic residents occurred following the fatal shooting of two men, the first of whom was unarmed. Protesting occurred in the area between State College and East Street, and was motivated by concerns over police brutality, gang activity, domination of the city by commercial interests, and a perceived lack of political representation of Hispanic residents in the city government. The protests were accompanied by looting of businesses and homes.

Geography
The city roughly follows the east-to-west route of the 91 Freeway from the Orange-Riverside county border to Buena Park. To the north, Anaheim is bounded by Yorba Linda, Placentia, Fullerton, and Buena Park (from east to west). The city shares its western border with Buena Park and Cypress. Anaheim is bordered on the south by Stanton, Garden Grove, and Orange (from west to east). Various unincorporated areas of Orange County also abut the city, including Anaheim Island.

Cityscape

The city recognizes several districts, including the Anaheim Resort (the area surrounding Disneyland), Anaheim Canyon (an industrial area north of California State Route 91 and east of California State Route 57), and the Platinum Triangle (the area surrounding Angel Stadium). Anaheim Hills also maintains a distinct identity. The contiguous commercial development from the Disney Resort through into the cities of Orange, Garden Grove and Santa Ana has collectively been termed the Anaheim–Santa Ana edge city.

Climate

Like many other South Coast cities, Anaheim maintains a borderline hot semi-arid climate (Köppen BSh), a little short of a Mediterranean climate (Köppen Csa) characterized by warm winters with erratic heavy rainfalls, and hot, essentially rainless summers. The record high temperature in Anaheim is 115 °F (46 °C) on July 6, 2018 and the record low temperature is 30 °F (–1 °C) on February 15, 1990, and January 30, 2002.

Demographics

2010
The 2010 United States Census reported that Anaheim had a population of 336,265. The racial makeup of Anaheim was:
 177,237 (52.7%) White (27.5% non-Hispanic White alone),
 80,705 (24.0%) from other races
 49,857 (14.8%) Asian (4.4% Vietnamese, 3.6% Filipino, 2.0% Korean, 1.4% Chinese, 1.3% Indian)
1,607 (0.5%) Pacific Islander
 14,864 (4.4%) from two or more races (multiracial/mestizo)
 9,347 (2.8%) African American
 2,648 (0.8%) Native American

There were 177,467 Hispanic or Latino residents, of any race (52.8%); 46.0% of Anaheim's population was of Mexican descent, 1.2% Salvadoran, and 1.0% Guatemalan; the remainder of the Hispanic population came from smaller ancestral groups.

The census reported that 332,708 people (98.9% of the population) lived in households, 2,020 (0.6%) lived in non-institutionalized group quarters, and 1,537 (0.5%) were institutionalized.

There were 98,294 households, out of which 44,045 (44.8%) had children under the age of 18 living in them, 52,518 (53.4%) were opposite-sex married couples living together, 14,553 (14.8%) had a female householder with no husband present, 7,223 (7.3%) had a male householder with no wife present. There were 6,173 (6.3%) unmarried opposite-sex partnerships, and 733 (0.7%) same-sex married couples or partnerships. 17,448 households (17.8%) were made up of individuals, and 6,396 (6.5%) had someone living alone who was 65 years of age or older. The average household size was 3.38. There were 74,294 families (75.6% of all households); the average family size was 3.79.

The age distribution of the population was as follows: 91,917 people (27.3%) under the age of 18, 36,506 people (10.9%) aged 18 to 24, 101,110 people (30.1%) aged 25 to 44, 75,510 people (22.5%) aged 45 to 64, and 31,222 people (9.3%) who were 65 years of age or older. The median age was 32.4 years. For every 100 females, there were 99.0 males. For every 100 females age 18 and over, there were 97.1 males.

The homeowner vacancy rate was 1.7%; the rental vacancy rate was 7.2%. 160,843 people (47.8% of the population) lived in owner-occupied housing units and 171,865 people (51.1%) lived in rental housing units.

According to the 2010 United States Census, Anaheim had a median household income of $59,627, with 15.6% of the population living below the federal poverty line.

2000
As of the census of 2000, there were 328,014 people, 96,969 households, and 73,502 families residing in the city. The population density was 6,842.7 inhabitants per square mile (2,587.8/km2). The racial makeup of the city was 55% White, 3% Black or African American, 0.9% Native American, 12% Asian, 0.4% Pacific Islander, 24% from other races, and 5% from two or more races. 46% of the population were Hispanic or Latino.

Of Anaheim's 96,969 households, 43.0% had children under the age of 18 living with them, 56.3% were married couples living together, 13.1% had a female householder with no husband present, and 24.2% were non-families. 18.1% of all households were made up of individuals, and 6.1% had someone living alone who was 65 years of age or older. The average household size was 3.34 and the average family size was 3.75.

In the city, the population was spread out, with 30.2% under the age of 18, 10.5% from 18 to 24, 33.5% from 25 to 44, 17.7% from 45 to 64, and 8.2% who were 65 years of age or older. The median age was 30 years. For every 100 females, there were 100.1 males. For every 100 females age 18 and over, there were 98.1 males.

The median income household income was $47,122, and the median family income was $49,969. Males had a median income of $33,870 versus $28,837 for females. The per capita income for the city was $18,266. About 10.4% of families and 14.1% of the population were below the poverty line, including 18.9% of those under age 18 and 7.5% of those age 65 or over.

Economy

Anaheim's income is based on a tourism economy. In addition to The Walt Disney Company being the city's largest employer, the Disneyland Resort itself contributes about $4.7 billion annually to Southern California's economy. It also produces $255 million in taxes every year. Another source of tourism is the Anaheim Convention Center, which is home to many important national conferences. Many hotels, especially in the city's Resort district, serve theme park tourists and conventiongoers. Continuous development of commercial, entertainment, and cultural facilities stretches from the Disney area east to the Santa Ana River, south into the cities of Garden Grove, Orange and Santa Ana – collectively, this area has been labeled the Anaheim–Santa Ana edge city and is one of the three largest such clusters in Orange County, together with the South Coast Plaza–John Wayne Airport edge city and Irvine Spectrum.

The Anaheim Canyon business park makes up 63% of Anaheim's industrial space and is the largest industrial district in Orange County. Anaheim Canyon is also home to the second-largest business park in Orange County.

Several notable companies have corporate offices and/or headquarters within Anaheim.

 Anaheim Memorial Medical Center
 AT&T
 Banco Popular, a bank based in Puerto Rico, has its mainland American headquarters in Anaheim
 CKE Restaurants, the parent company of the Carl's Jr., Hardee's, Green Burrito, and Red Burrito restaurant chains (formerly headquartered)
 Disneyland Resort, part of Walt Disney Parks, Experiences and Consumer Products, a subsidiary of the Walt Disney Company
 Extron Electronics, designs, manufactures, and services A/V electronics worldwide
 Fisker Automotive
 Fujitsu, computer
 General Dynamics
 Hewlett Packard
 Isuzu North American headquarters
 Kaiser Foundation
 L-3 Communications
 Living Stream Ministry
 Pacific Sunwear
 Panasonic
 Pendarvis Manufacturing
 Raytheon
 Sunny Delight
 Targus, a computer peripheral manufacturer
 Tenet Healthcare
 Toyota Financial Services
 YKK, world's largest zipper manufacturing firm
 Yogurtland
 Zyxel, maker of routers, switches and other networking products

Top employers
According to the city's 2021 Annual Comprehensive Financial Report, the top employers in the city are:

Retail
Larger retail centers include the Downtown Disney shopping area at the Disneyland Resort, the power centers Anaheim Plaza in western Anaheim (347,000 ft), and Anaheim Town Square in East Anaheim (374,000 ft), as well as the Anaheim GardenWalk lifestyle center (440,000 ft of retail, dining and entertainment located in the Anaheim Resort).

Attractions
 American Sports Centers, home of the U.S. men's national volleyball team and U.S. women's national volleyball team
 Anaheim Convention Center
 Anaheim GardenWalk
 Anaheim Hills Golf Course
 Anaheim Founders' Park
 Anaheim Ice
 Anaheim/OC Walk of Stars
 Angel Stadium of Anaheim
 Dad Miller Golf Course
 Disneyland Resort
 Disneyland Park
 Disney California Adventure Park
 Downtown Disney
 Flightdeck Flight Simulation Center
 The Grove of Anaheim, formerly the Sun Theater, formerly Tinseltown Studios
 Honda Center, formerly the Arrowhead Pond of Anaheim
 La Palma Park
 MUZEO, Art Museum located in Downtown Anaheim
 Oak Canyon Nature Center

Sports teams

Current teams
 NHL team: Anaheim Ducks – 2007 Stanley Cup Champions
 MLB team: Los Angeles Angels – 2002 World Series Champions under the name Anaheim Angels

Defunct or relocated teams
 NLL team: Anaheim Storm (Folded after 2004–2005 season because of low attendance)
 NFL team: Los Angeles Rams played in Anaheim in Anaheim Stadium from 1980 through 1994 before moving to St. Louis, Missouri.
 NBA team: Los Angeles Clippers played select games in Anaheim at Arrowhead Pond of Anaheim from 1994 through 1999 before moving permanently to Crypto.com Arena in Downtown Los Angeles.
 World Football League team: The Southern California Sun played at Anaheim Stadium from 1974 to 1975.
 Arena Football League team: Anaheim Piranhas played at the Arrowhead Pond from 1994 to 1997.
 AFL team: Los Angeles Kiss played at Honda Center from 2014 to 2016.
 Roller Hockey International team: Anaheim Bullfrogs played in the RHI from 1993 to 1997 and 1999, winning the Murphy Cup Championship twice.
 American Basketball Association team: Anaheim Amigos played at the Anaheim Convention Center during the 1967–68 Season, then moved to Los Angeles.
 ABA2000 team: Southern California Surf played at the Anaheim Convention Center from 2001 to 2002.
 NBADL team: Anaheim Arsenal played at the Anaheim Convention Center from 2006 to 2009. The team moved to Springfield, Massachusetts and was renamed for the 2009–2010 season.
 World Team Tennis: The Anaheim Oranges played in 1978.
 Continental Indoor Soccer League Team: The Anaheim Splash, played from 1994 to 1997.
 California Surf of the now defunct North American Soccer League played from 1978 to 1981.

Court battle against the Angels

On January 3, 2005, Angels Baseball LP, the ownership group for the Anaheim Angels, announced that it would change the name of the club to the Los Angeles Angels of Anaheim. Team spokesmen pointed out that from its inception, the Angels had been granted territorial rights by Major League Baseball to the counties of Los Angeles, Ventura, Riverside, and San Bernardino in addition to Orange County. The new owner, Arturo Moreno, believed the name would help him market the team to the entire Southern California region rather than just Orange County. The "of Anaheim" was included in the official name to comply with a provision of the team's lease at Angel Stadium which requires that "Anaheim" be included in the team's name.

Mayor Curt Pringle and other city officials countered that the name change violated the spirit of the lease clause, even if it was in technical compliance. They argued that a name change was a major bargaining chip in negotiations between the city and Disney Baseball Enterprises, Inc., then the ownership group for the Angels. They further argued that the city would never have agreed to the new lease without the name change, because the new lease required that the city partially fund the stadium's renovation, but provided very little revenue for the city. Anaheim sued Angels Baseball LP in Orange County Superior Court, and a jury trial was completed in early February 2006, resulting in a victory for the Angels franchise.

Anaheim appealed the court decision with the California Court of Appeal in May 2006. The case was tied up in the Appeals Court for over two years. In December 2008, the Appeals Court upheld the February 2006 Decision and ruled in favor of Angels Baseball. In January 2009, the Anaheim City Council voted not to appeal the court case any further, bringing an end to the four-year legal dispute.

Government and politics
Anaheim was, at one point in time, one of the most politically conservative major cities in the United States. However, in recent years it has been moving leftward. According to the California Secretary of State, as of October 22, 2018, Anaheim has 141,549 registered voters. Of those, 58,411 (41.27%) are registered Democrats, 39,885 (28.18%) are registered Republicans, and 37,877 (26.76%) have declined to state a political party.

City government

Under its city charter, Anaheim operates under a council–manager government. Legislative authority is vested in a city council of seven nonpartisan members, who hire a professional city manager to oversee day-to-day operations. The mayor serves as the presiding officer of the city council in a first among equals role. Under the city's term limits, an individual may serve a maximum of two terms as a city council member and two terms as the mayor.

Up until 2014, all council seats were elected at large. Voters elected the mayor and four other members of the city council to serve four-year staggered terms. Elections for two council seats were held in years divisible by four while elections for the mayor and the two other council seats were elected during the intervening even-numbered years.

In response to protests and a California Voting Rights Act lawsuit by the American Civil Liberties Union and several residents, the city placed two measures on the November 2014 ballot. Measure L proposed that council members be elected by district instead of at large. Measure M proposed to increase the number of council seats from five to seven. Both measures passed.

The current city council consists of:
 Mayor Ashleigh Aitken (since 2022)
 Jose Diaz, District 1 (since 2020)
 Carlos A. Leon, District 2 (since 2022)
 Natalie Rubalcava District 3 (since 2022)
 District 4 (vacant)
 Stephen Faessel, District 5 (since 2016)
 Natalie Meeks, District 6 (since 2022)

Federal, state and county representation
In the United States House of Representatives, Anaheim is split between two districts:
  since 2021, and
  since 2017.

In the California State Senate, Anaheim is split between two districts:
  since 2018, and
  since 2020.

In the California State Assembly, Anaheim is split among three districts:
  since 2016,
  since 2016, and
  since 2022.

On the Orange County Board of Supervisors, Anaheim is split among three districts, with Anaheim Hills in the 3rd District, West Anaheim and northern Anaheim in the 4th District, and the remainder of Anaheim in the 2nd district:
 the 2nd supervisorial district, represented by Democrat Vicente Sarmiento since 2023,
 the 3rd supervisorial district, represented by Republican Donald P. Wagner since 2019, and
 the 4th supervisorial district, represented by Democrat Doug Chaffee since 2019.

Infrastructure

Emergency services

Fire protection is provided by the Anaheim Fire Department, Disneyland Resort has its own Fire Department, though it does rely on the Anaheim Fire Department for support, and for Paramedic Services. Law enforcement is provided by the Anaheim Police Department. Ambulance service is provided by Care Ambulance Service.

Anaheim Public Utilities
Anaheim Public Utilities is the only municipal owned water and electric utility in Orange County, providing residential and business customers with water and electric services. The utility is regulated and governed locally by the City Council. A Public Utilities Board, made up of Anaheim residents, advises the City Council on major utility issues.

Anaheim has decided to bury power lines along major transportation corridors, converting its electricity system for aesthetic and reliability reasons. To minimize the impact on customer bills, undergrounding is taking place slowly over a period of 50 years, funded by a 4% surcharge on electric bills.

Crime
In 2019, Anaheim reported 8 murders; given its population, this rate was lower than the average national rate by 17%. Reported rapes in the city are relatively uncommon as well, but have been increasing, along with the national average. Robbery (396 reported incidents) and aggravated assault (575 incidents) rank among the most frequent violent crimes in the city, though robbery rates are slightly less than the national average. 1,123 burglaries were reported, as well as 5,904 thefts and 1,231 car thefts. All three types of crime were below average.

Education

Schools
Anaheim is served by seven public school districts:

 Anaheim Elementary School District
 Anaheim Union High School District
 Centralia School District
 Magnolia School District
 Orange Unified School District
 Placentia-Yorba Linda Unified School District
 Savanna School District

Anaheim is home to 74 public schools, of which 47 serve elementary students, nine are junior high schools, fourteen are high schools and three offer alternative education.

Private schools in the city include Acaciawood Preparatory Academy, Cornelia Connelly High School, Fairmont Preparatory Academy, Servite High School and Zion Lutheran School (PS2-Grade 8).

Higher education
Anaheim has two private universities: Anaheim University and Southern California Institute of Technology (SCIT).

The North Orange County Community College District and Rancho Santiago Community College District serve the community.

Libraries
Anaheim has eight public library branches.

Transportation
In the main portion of the city (not including Anaheim Hills), the major surface streets running west–east, starting with the northernmost, are Orangethorpe Avenue, La Palma Avenue, Lincoln Avenue, Ball Road, and Katella Avenue. The major surface streets running south–north, starting with the westernmost, are Knott Avenue, Beach Boulevard (SR 39), Magnolia Avenue, Brookhurst Street, Euclid Street, West Street/Disneyland Drive, Harbor Boulevard, Anaheim Boulevard, East Street, State College Boulevard, Kraemer Boulevard, and Tustin Avenue.

In Anaheim Hills, the major surface streets that run west–east include Orangethorpe Avenue, La Palma Avenue, Santa Ana Canyon Road, and Nohl Ranch Road. Major surface streets that run north–south include Lakeview Avenue and Fairmont Boulevard. Imperial Highway (SR 90) and Yorba Linda Boulevard/Weir Canyon Road run as south–north roads in the city of Anaheim, but north of Anaheim, Imperial Highway and Yorba Linda Boulevard become west–east arterials.

Seven Caltrans state-maintained highways (in addition to the aforementioned surface streets SR 39 and SR 90) run through the city of Anaheim, four of which are freeways and one being a toll road. They include the Santa Ana Freeway (I-5), the Orange Freeway (SR 57), and the Riverside Freeway (SR 91). The Costa Mesa Freeway (SR 55), and the Eastern Transportation Corridor (SR 241 toll road) also have short stretches within the city limits.

Anaheim is served by two major railroads, the Union Pacific Railroad and the BNSF Railway. In addition, the Anaheim Regional Transportation Intermodal Center (ARTIC), a major regional transit station near Honda Center and Angel Stadium, serves Amtrak, Metrolink, and several bus operators, and the Anaheim Canyon Metrolink station serves Metrolink's Inland Empire–Orange County Line. ARTIC is a proposed stop on the proposed California High-Speed Rail network.

The Orange County Transportation Authority (OCTA) provides bus service for Anaheim with local and county-wide routes, and both OCTA and Los Angeles County Metro operate bus routes connecting Anaheim to Los Angeles County and Riverside Transit Agency operates one bus route to serve Riverside and San Bernardino. Also, Anaheim Resort Transit (ART) provides local shuttle service in and around the Anaheim Resort area, serving local hotels, tourist attractions, and the Disneyland Resort. Disney GOALS operates daily free bus service for low-income youth in the central Anaheim area. A proposal for streetcar service along Harbor Boulevard was rejected in 2018.

Anaheim is equidistant from John Wayne Airport and Long Beach Airport (15 miles), but is also accessible from nearby Los Angeles International (30 miles), and Ontario (35 miles) airports.

Notable people

Sister cities 
Anaheim has the following sister cities:
 Mito, Japan
 Vitoria-Gasteiz, Spain

See also
 History of California
 List of cities and towns in California
 List of museums in Orange County, California
 List of U.S. cities with large Hispanic populations

References

Bibliography

External links 

 
 Anaheim Historical Society
 Anaheim, California on the C-SPAN Cities Tour website

 
1857 establishments in California
1876 establishments in California
Cities in Orange County, California
Polish-American history
German-American history
Incorporated cities and towns in California
Populated places on the Santa Ana River
Populated places established in 1857
Populated places established in 1876
Chicano and Mexican neighborhoods in California